Tuen Mun Hospital is a public hospital, with a 24-hour accident and emergency department, in Tuen Mun, New Territories, Hong Kong. Its construction began in 1979, and it was inaugurated on 8 March 1990. It is governed by the Hospital Authority, and is designated under New Territories West Cluster.

History
Tuen Mun Hospital was designed by the Architectural Services Department. It was constructed by Aoki Corporation, a Japanese civil engineering and construction services firm. The hospital was topped out in a ceremony hosted by Sir David Akers-Jones on 28 August 1986, at which time it was the largest hospital under construction in the world.

The hospital commenced services on 8 March 1990 and cost HK$1.2 billion. The accident and emergency department opened on 30 July that year.

Management

Hospital Governing Committee
This is a list of the current and former chairmen of the committee:

William Chan Fu-keung

Hospital Chief executive
Appointed by the Hospital Authority, the Hospital Chief executive is in charge of managing the hospital and reports to the Hospital Governing Committee.

Dr Simon Tang Yiu-hang (1 April 2018 – present)

Medical Superintendents
Cheng Pak-wing
Liu Shao-haei

Services
, the hospital had 1,935 beds and around 6,487 members of staff. For the year ended 31 March 2017, it treated 174,586 inpatients and day-patients, 776,713 specialist outpatients, and 851,943 general outpatients.

Specialties
Accident and emergency department
Anaesthesiology
Clinical Oncology
Clinical Pathology
Dentistry
Dermatology
Radiology
Mentally Handicapped
Neurosurgery
Nuclear Medicine
Obstetrics & Gynaecology
Ophthalmology
Orthopaedics & Traumatology
Paediatrics & Adolescent Medicine
Ear, Nose & Throat
Psychiatry
Medicine & Geriatrics
Surgery
Renal

Others
Audiology
Cancer Patient Resource Centre
Clinical psychology
Dietetics
Emergency Radiation Treatment Centre
Geriatric Community Assessment Service
Geriatric Day Hospital
Occupational Therapy
Optometry
Physiotherapy
Podiatry
Procedure Unit
Prosthetic-orthotic Services
Speech Therapy

Facilities
The ground floor of the hospital is occupied by the casualty ward, and a day-care centre. The hospital has recently established a trauma unit and a neo-natal intensive care unit.

Tuen Mun Hospital also has a General Out-Patient Clinic or Polyclinic. The Yan Oi Polyclinic at 6 Tuen Lee Street is not to be mistaken for the fictional Yan Oi Hospital from the TVB series The Hippocratic Crush.

It is the only hospital with an operational helipad in New Territories, and one of the two hospitals in Hong Kong (Pamela Youde Nethersole Eastern Hospital and Tuen Mun Hospital).

It is one of the two major Radiation Emergency Treatment Centres in Hong Kong (Pamela Youde Nethersole Eastern Hospital and Tuen Mun Hospital), and the only one in New Territories.

Transport
It is served by the Tuen Mun Hospital stop of the MTR Light Rail.

References

External links

1990 establishments in Hong Kong
Hospital buildings completed in 1990
Hospitals established in 1990
Hospitals in Hong Kong
Tuen Mun